The 2022 Interwetten German Darts Championship was the second of thirteen PDC European Tour events on the 2022 PDC Pro Tour. The tournament took place at Halle 39, Hildesheim from 11 to 13 March 2022. It featured a field of 48 players and £140,000 in prize money, with £25,000 going to the winner.

Devon Petersen was  the defending champion after defeating Jonny Clayton 8–3 in the 2020 final, but lost to  Michael Smith in the second round.

Michael van Gerwen won his 33rd European Tour title after beating Rob Cross 8–5 in the final, after surviving three match darts in his semi-final match against Dimitri Van den Bergh.

Prize money
The prize money was unchanged from the European Tours of the last 3 years:

 Seeded players who lose in the second round and host nation qualifiers (who qualify automatically as a result of their ranking) who lose in their first match of the event shall not be credited with prize money on any Order of Merit. A player who qualifies as a qualifier, but later becomes a seed due to the withdrawal of one or more other players shall be credited with their prize money on all Orders of Merit regardless of how far they progress in the event.

Qualification and format
The top 16 entrants from the PDC ProTour Order of Merit on 1 February automatically qualified for the event and were seeded in the second round.

The remaining 32 places went to players from six qualifying events – 24 from the Tour Card Holder Qualifier (held on 11 February), two from the Associate Member Qualifier (held on 23 February), the two highest ProTour ranking German players, two from the Host Nation Qualifier (held on 24 February), one from the Nordic & Baltic Associate Member Qualifier (held on 28 January), and one from the East European Associate Member Qualifier (held on 5 March).

Seeds Gerwyn Price and Brendan Dolan withdrew after the qualifiers, so Gabriel Clemens and Chris Dobey were promoted into the seeded positions, while unseeded Ted Evetts also withdrew, resulting in a total of three first round byes.

Peter Wright withdrew from his quarter-final match with a back injury, so Michael van Gerwen received a bye to the semi-finals.

The following players took part in the tournament.

Top 16
  (third round)
  (quarter-finals)
  (quarter-finals, withdrew)
  (quarter-finals)
  (third round)
  (champion)
  (third round)
  (runner-up)
  (third round)
  (semi-finals)
  (second round)
  (second round)
  (second round)
  (third round)
  (second round)
  (second round)

Tour Card Qualifier
  (first round)
  (second round)
  (first round)
  (first round)
  (second round)
  (second round)
  (second round)
  (semi-finals)
  (second round)
  (third round)
  (second round)
  (first round)
  (first round)
  (third round)
  (first round)
  (second round)
  (second round)
  (third round)
  (first round)
  (first round)
  (second round)
  (second round)

Associate Member Qualifier
  (first round)
  (first round)

Highest Ranked Germans
  (second round)

Host Nation Qualifier
  (first round)
  (first round)

Nordic & Baltic Qualifier
  (first round)

East European Qualifier
  (quarter-finals)

Draw

References

2022 PDC Pro Tour
2022 PDC European Tour
2022 in German sport
German Darts Championship